Paraqianlabeo lineatus is a species of fish in the family Cyprinidae found in Yangtze river basin in Guizhou Province, South China. It is the type species of the genus Paraqianlabeo.

References

Labeoninae
Cyprinid fish of Asia
Fish of China
Fish described in 2014